Paul-Louis Arslanian is a French public servant, former head of the French Bureau d'enquêtes et d'analyses pour la sécurité de l'aviation civile (1995-2009). Arslanian is Officier of the Légion d'honneur, graduates from École polytechnique (promotion 1965) and École nationale de l'aviation civile (promotion 1970).

Biography 
Arslanian began his career as civil aviation engineer at the Directorate General for Civil Aviation followed by the Inspection générale de l'aviation civile et de la météorologie (IGACEM). He became head of the Bureau d'enquêtes et d'analyses pour la sécurité de l'aviation civile in 1995. He was replaced by Jean-Paul Troadec in 2009.

Bibliography 
 Académie nationale de l'air et de l'espace and Lucien Robineau, Les français du ciel, dictionnaire historique, Le Cherche midi, June 2005, 782 p., p. 38, Arslanian, Paul-Louis

References 

Living people
French aerospace engineers
Space program of France
École Polytechnique alumni
École nationale de l'aviation civile alumni
Corps de l'aviation civile
Corps des ponts
Aviation in France
Officiers of the Légion d'honneur
Year of birth missing (living people)